Matthew Kent Broha (born June 6, 1989) is a former American football defensive end. He signed with the New York Giants as an undrafted free agent. He played defensive end at Louisiana Tech.

References

External links
Louisiana Tech Bulldogs bio
New York Giants bio

1989 births
Living people
American football defensive ends
Louisiana Tech Bulldogs football players
New York Giants players
Catholic High School (Baton Rouge, Louisiana) alumni